Katō, Kato, Katou or Katoh (加藤, characters for "add/increase" and "wisteria") is the 10th most common Japanese surname. Notable people with the surname include:

, Japanese actress and idol
, Japanese field hockey player
, Japanese field hockey player
, Japanese curler and coach
, Japanese Go player
, Japanese politician
, Japanese comedian, actor and musician
, Japanese volleyball player
, Japanese motorcycle racer
, Japanese footballer
, Japanese actor
, Japanese baseball player
, Japanese ninja
, Imperial Japanese Navy officer
, Japanese painter
, Japanese voice actress
, Japanese poet
, Japanese cross-country skier
Funky Kato (born 1978), Japanese singer-songwriter
, Japanese entertainer and actor
Hajime Katō (disambiguation), multiple people
, Japanese gravure idol, television personality and professional wrestler
, Japanese baseball player
, Japanese musician and composer
, Japanese footballer
, Japanese shogi player
, Japanese footballer
, Japanese footballer and manager
, Japanese aikidoka
, Japanese academic and politician
, Japanese mixed martial artist and kickboxer
, Japanese footballer and manager
, Japanese footballer
, Japanese swimmer
, Japanese speed skater
, Japanese tennis player
, Japanese rower
, Japanese streamer
, Japanese footballer
, Japanese naval officer
Kaori Kato (born 1977), Japanese women cricketer
, Japanese politician
, Japanese manga artist
, Japanese actor and singer
, Japanese mathematician
, Japanese sport shooter
, Japanese women's professional shogi player
, Japanese actor
, Japanese footballer
, Japanese footballer
, Japanese sport wrestler
, Japanese daimyō
Kiyomi Kato (disambiguation), multiple people
, Japanese footballer
Koichi Kato (disambiguation), multiple people
, Japanese footballer
, Japanese baseball player
, better known as Koyuki, Japanese model and actress
, Japanese animator
, Japanese photographer
, Japanese footballer
, Japanese figure skater
, Japanese footballer
, Japanese swimmer
, Japanese game developer and scenario writer
, Japanese actor
, Japanese entomologist
, Japanese baseball player
, Japanese voice actress
, Japanese handball player
, Japanese singer-songwriter
, Japanese idol and singer
, Japanese basketball coach
, Japanese footballer
, Japanese samurai and daimyō
, Japanese speed skater
Miyu Kato (disambiguation), multiple people
, Japanese shogi player
, Japanese voice actress
, Japanese illustrator
, Japanese actress
, Japanese engineer
, Japanese footballer
, Japanese sprinter
, Japanese footballer
, Japanese singer and actress
, Japanese footballer
, Japanese singer and idol
Ricky Kato (born 1994), Australian golfer
, Japanese figure skater
, Japanese gymnast
, Japanese actress and model
, Japanese actor and television personality
, Japanese lawyer and diplomat
, Japanese footballer
, Imperial Japanese Navy admiral
, Japanese Paralympic swimmer
Satori Kato, Japanese chemist
, Japanese gymnast
, Japanese actor
, Japanese voice actor
, Japanese activist and politician
, Japanese idol and singer
, Japanese idol and model
, Japanese Go player
, Japanese footballer
, Japanese baseball player
, better known as SO-SO, Japanese beatboxer and looper
Shuichi Kato (disambiguation), multiple people

, Japanese professional wrestler
, Japanese samurai
, Japanese rower
, Japanese cyclist
, Japanese film director and screenwriter
, Japanese Nordic combined skier
, Japanese footballer
, Japanese pornographic film actor
, Japanese politician, diplomat and Prime Minister of Japan
Takako Katō (disambiguation), multiple people
, Japanese handball player
, Japanese baseball player
, Japanese baseball player
, Japanese footballer
, Japanese cyclist
Takeshi Katō (disambiguation), multiple people
, Japanese baseball player
, Japanese World War II flying ace
, Japanese baseball player
, Japanese composer
, Japanese journalist
, Japanese mixed martial artist
, Japanese painter
, Japanese singer-songwriter and actress
, Japanese surgeon
, Japanese women's footballer
, Japanese mass murderer
, Imperial Japanese Navy admiral, politician and Prime Minister of Japan
, Japanese footballer
, Japanese politician
, Japanese mathematician
, Japanese contemporary artist
, cofounder of Korg
, Japanese footballer
, Japanese daimyō
, Japanese footballer
, Japanese volleyball player
, Japanese neurosurgeon
, Japanese actor
, Japanese daimyō
, Japanese film director and screenwriter
, Japanese footballer
, Japanese footballer and manager
, Japanese Paralympic judoka
, Japanese swimmer
, Japanese idol and singer
Yuki Kato japanese actress
, Japanese shogi player
, Japanese triathlete
, Japanese footballer
, Japanese model, actress and beauty pageant winner

Fictional characters
, a character in the Green Hornet series
Go Kato, a character in the manga series Someday's Dreamers
Griffin Kato, a character in the manga series Rave Master
, a character in the anime series Digimon Tamers
, a character in the manga series Prince of Tennis
Kazumi Kato, a character in The Order of the Stick webcomic
, a character in the light novel and anime series Sound! Euphonium
, protagonist of the light novel series Bodacious Space Pirates
, a character in the video game Shadow Hearts: Covenant
, a character in the manga series Gantz
, a character in the light novel series Saekano: How to Raise a Boring Girlfriend
, a character in the visual novel School Days
, a character in the anime series Space Battleship Yamato
, a character in the tokusatsu series Shuriken Sentai Ninninger
, protagonist of the novel series Teito Monogatari
, a character in the manga series Angel Sanctuary
, a character in the manga series Doubt!
Haru Kato (加藤 春), a character in the anime series The Millionaire Detective Balance: Unlimited

References

Japanese-language surnames